Nicola Rebisso (born 1889, date of death unknown) was an Italian sports shooter. He competed in two events at the 1924 Summer Olympics.

References

External links
 

1889 births
Year of death missing
Italian male sport shooters
Olympic shooters of Italy
Shooters at the 1924 Summer Olympics
Place of birth missing
20th-century Italian people